Songs You Make at Night is the sixth studio album from English band Tunng. It was released on 24 August 2018 under Full Time Hobby.

Critical reception
Songs You Make at Night was met with "universal acclaim" reviews from critics. At Metacritic, which assigns a weighted average rating out of 100 to reviews from mainstream publications, this release received an average score of 82 based on 10 reviews. Aggregator Album of the Year gave the release a 77 out of 100 based on a critical consensus of 11 reviews.

Track listing

"ABOP" contains a sample of Mary Millington

Charts

References

Tunng albums
2018 albums
Full Time Hobby albums